Erlebnispark Tripsdrill is a wildlife and theme park near Cleebronn in Southern Germany.  Covering  in total, the park offers 29 attractions, including museums, animal petting and feeding, roller coasters, playgrounds, and a theatre.  Opened in 1929, it is Germany's oldest amusement park and is still owned and managed by the same family.

History 
Eugen Fischer built a windmill on the site in 1929 and opened a restaurant there. He called the mill "Old Women's Mill" and included a slide for playing on. After Eugen's death in the Second World War, his son Kurt carried on the restaurant, expanding the catering to a park. The windmill was destroyed by fire in 1946 following a lightning strike, and rebuilt by Kurt in 1950.

Over the following years attractions were added to the park. In 1957, a zoo opened with approximately 300 animals. A mechanical attraction arrived in 1960 in the form of pedal-driven locomotives. The zoo was transformed into a wildlife park and petting zoo in 1972, which was expanded in 1976 to include over 1,000 animals. The wine museum ‘Vinarium’ contains the largest collection of wood-spindle presses in Germany.

Kurt Fischer handed on the management of the park to his sons Roland, Helmut, and Dieter in 1996, and died on 28 January 2010.

In 2013, the park opened a new launched coaster called Karacho.

For the 2020 season, the park added two new roller coasters by Vekoma. These coasters were Volldampf and Hals-über-Kopf.

Current park management and attractions 
Approximately 600,000 people visit Tripsdrill each year and the park employs about 150 people.  The theme park area opens from late March to early November, but the wildlife park is open all year.

Originality, attention to detail, and a preference for local building firms and materials is an important emphasis at Tripsdrill.  The park was one of the first to install the now-ubiquitous "teacups" ride and its Bathtub Flume Ride is the tallest in Europe.

Its largest installation to date, Mammut, built in 2008, is an entirely wooden roller coaster, the first of its kind in Southern Germany, and themed as a sawmill. The stunt took just over 60 seconds and set a new world record.

Wildlife Park 

Expanded in 1972 from a petting zoo to  dedicated to nature and animals, Tripsdrill's wildlife park looks after 130 animals of various species. Most of the animals can be fed and petted by visitors year-round. There are falconry demonstrations and feeding viewings, several paths, and a playground area.

References

External links 

 Official website of Erlebnispark Tripsdrill (German)
 Smaller English version
 Official Fansite (German)

Amusement parks in Germany
Buildings and structures in Heilbronn (district)
Zoos in Germany
Tourist attractions in Baden-Württemberg
1929 establishments in Germany